In the philosophy of existentialism, bad faith (mauvaise foi) is the psychological phenomenon whereby individuals act inauthentically, by yielding to the external pressures of society to adopt false values and disown their innate freedom as sentient human beings. Bad faith also derives from the related concepts of self-deception and ressentiment.

Freedom and choice
A critical claim in existentialist thought is that individuals are always free to make choices and guide their lives towards their own chosen goal or "project". This claim suggests that individuals cannot escape this freedom, even in overwhelming circumstances. For instance, even an empire's colonized victims possess choices: to submit to rule, to negotiate, to commit suicide, to resist nonviolently, or to counter-attack.

Although external circumstances may limit individuals (this limitation from the outside is called facticity), they cannot force a person to follow one of the remaining courses over another. In this sense the individual still has some freedom of choice. For this reason, an individual may choose in anguish, fully aware that  this will have consequences. For Sartre, to claim that one amongst many conscious possibilities takes undeniable precedence (for instance, "I cannot risk my life, because I must support my family") is to assume the role of an object in the world, not a free agent, but merely at the mercy of circumstance (a being-in-itself that is only its own facticity, i.e., it "is" inside itself, and acts there as a limitation). For Sartre, this attitude is manifestly self-deceiving.

Intentional consciousness and freedom
According to this philosophy, humans are always aware that they are more than what they are aware of. In other words, they are not whatever they are aware of. In this sense, humans cannot be defined as "intentional objects" of consciousness that includes the restrictions imposed by facticity, personal history, character, bodies, or objective responsibility. Thus, as Sartre often repeated, "Human reality is what it is not, and it is not what it is." An example of what he means is being a doctor but wishing to "transcend" that to become a pig farmer. One is who one is not: a pig farmer, not who one is, a doctor. 

One can only define oneself negatively, as "what it is not", and this negation is the only positive definition of "what it is."

From this we are aware of a host of alternative reactions to our freedom to choose an objective situation, since no situation can dictate a single response. We pretend that these possibilities are denied to us by assuming social roles and value systems external to this nature . But this is itself a decision made possible by our freedom and our separation from these things. 

"Bad faith" is the paradoxical free decision to deny to ourselves this inescapable freedom.

Examples

Sartre
Sartre cites a café waiter, whose movements and conversation are a little too "waiter-esque". His voice oozes with an eagerness to please; he carries food rigidly and ostentatiously; "his movement is quick and forward, a little too precise, a little too rapid". His exaggerated behaviour illustrates that he is play-acting as a waiter, as an object in the world: an automaton whose essence is to be a waiter. But that he is obviously acting believes that he is aware that he is not (merely) a waiter, but is rather consciously deceiving himself.

Another of Sartre's examples involves a young woman on a first date. She ignores the obvious sexual implications of her date's compliments to her physical appearance, but accepts them instead as words directed at her as a human consciousness. As he takes her hand, she lets it rest indifferently in his, "neither consenting nor resisting – a thing" – refusing either to return the gesture or to rebuke it. Thus she delays the moment when she must choose either to acknowledge and reject his advances, or consent to them. She conveniently considers her hand only a thing in the world, and his compliments as unrelated to her body, playing on her dual human reality as a physical being, and as a consciousness separate and free from this physicality.

Sartre suggests that by acting in bad faith the waiter and the woman are denying their own freedom, by  using their freedom to do so. They manifestly know they are free, but are actively choosing not to acknowledge it. Bad faith is paradoxical in this regard: when acting in bad faith, a person is actively denying their own freedom, while relying on it to perform the denial.

De Beauvoir
De Beauvoir described three main types of women acting in bad faith: the Narcissist who denies her freedom by construing herself as a desirable object; the Mystic, who invests her freedom in an absolute; and the Woman in Love, who submerges her identity in that of her male object.

She also considered what she called the Serious Man, who subordinated himself to some outside cause, to be in bad faith inasmuch as he denies his own freedom.

Two modes of consciousness
Sartre claims that the consciousness with which we generally consider our surroundings is different from our reflecting on this consciousness, i.e., the consciousness of "ourselves being conscious of these surroundings". The first kind of consciousness, before we think about, or reflect on, our previous consciousness, is called pre-reflective. Reflecting on the pre-reflective consciousness is called reflective consciousness. But this cannot be called unconsciousness, as Freud used the term. Sartre gives the example of running after a bus: one does not become conscious of "one's running after the bus" until one has ceased to run after it, because until then one's consciousness is focused on the bus itself, and not one's chasing it.

In this sense consciousness always entails being self-aware (being for-itself). Since for Sartre consciousness also entails a consciousness of our separation from the world, and hence freedom, we are also always aware of this. But we can manipulate these two levels of consciousness, so that our reflective consciousness interprets the factual limits of our objective situation as insurmountable, whilst our pre-reflective consciousness remains aware of alternatives.

Freedom and morality

One convinces oneself, in some sense, to be bound to act by external circumstance, in order to escape the anguish of freedom. Sartre says that people are "condemned to be free": whether they adopt an "objective" moral system to do this choosing for them, or follow only their pragmatic concerns, they cannot help but be aware that they are not – fundamentally – part of them. Moreover, as possible intentional objects of one's consciousness, one is fundamentally not part of oneself, but rather exactly what one, as consciousness, defines oneself in opposition to; along with everything else one could be conscious of.

Fundamentally, Sartre believes humankind cannot escape responsibility by adopting an external moral system, as the adoption of such is in itself a choice that we endorse, implicitly or explicitly, for which we must take full responsibility. Sartre argues that one cannot escape this responsibility, as each attempt to part one's self from the freedom of choice is in itself a demonstration of choice, and choice is dependent on a person's wills and desires. He states "I am responsible for my very desire of fleeing responsibilities."

As a human, one cannot claim one's actions are determined by external forces; this is the core statement of existentialism. One is "condemned" to this eternal freedom; human beings exist before the definition of human identity exists. One cannot define oneself as a thing in the world, as one has the freedom to be otherwise. One is not "a philosopher", as at some point one must/will cease the activities that define the self as "a philosopher". Any role that one might adopt does not define one as there is an eventual end to one's adoption of the role; i.e. other roles will be assigned to us, "a chef", "a mother". The self is not constant, it cannot be a thing in the world. Though one cannot assign a positive value to definitions that may apply to oneself, one remains able to say what one is not.

This inner anguish over moral uncertainty is a central underlying theme in existentialism, as the anguish demonstrates a personal feeling of responsibility over the choices one makes throughout life. Without an emphasis on personal choice, one may make use of an external moral system as a tool to moralize otherwise immoral acts, leading to negation of the self. According to existentialism, dedicated professionals of their respective moral codes – priests interpreting sacred scriptures, lawyers interpreting the Constitution, doctors interpreting the Hippocratic oath – should, instead of divesting the self of responsibility in the discharge of their duties, be aware of their own significance in the process. This recognition involves the questioning of the morality of all choices, taking responsibility for the consequences of one's own choice and, therefore, a constant reappraisal of one's own and others' ever-changing humanity. One must not exercise bad faith by denying the self's freedom of choice and accountability. Taking on the burden of personal accountability in all situations is an intimidating proposition – by pointing out the freedom of the individual, Sartre seeks to demonstrate that the social roles and moral systems we adopt protect us from being morally accountable for our actions.

See also
False self
Albert Camus
Anomie 
Bad faith
Existentialism and Humanism
The Ethics of Ambiguity

References

Further reading
Being and Nothingness, Jean-Paul Sartre
False Consciousness cf. also Sartre's Marxism Mark Poster, Pluto Press, London 1979, and Critique of Dialectical Reason
Nausea, Jean-Paul Sartre
The Ethics of Ambiguity, Simone de Beauvoir

External links
Stanford Encyclopedia of Philosophy: Sartre
Sartre.org Articles, archives, and forum
Internet Encyclopedia of Philosophy: Simone de Beauvoir
	

Existentialist concepts
Deception
Jean-Paul Sartre
Simone de Beauvoir